Kevin Humphreys (born 4 February 1958) is an Irish former Labour Party politician who served as a Minister of State from 2014 to 2016. He served as a Teachta Dála (TD) for the Dublin South-East constituency from 2011 to 2016 and as a Senator for the Administrative Panel from 2016 to 2020.

Humphreys is from Ringsend. He was first politically active in the campaign against the Eighth Amendment in 1983, which gave constitutional recognition to the right to life of the unborn.

Humphreys first ran for election at the 1999 local elections, when he was elected as a member of Dublin City Council, representing the South East Inner City local electoral area. He represented the area until his election to the Dáil in 2011. He was re-elected in 2004 and 2009, topping the poll both times. During this period, Humphreys worked with then Lord Mayor, Andrew Montague to deliver the Dublin Bikes scheme.

He was elected as a Labour Party TD for Dublin South-East at the 2011 general election. On 15 July 2014, he was appointed by the Fine Gael–Labour government as Minister of State at the Department of Social Protection with special responsibility for Employment, Community and Social Support. He lost his Dáil seat at the 2016 general election on 26 February, contesting the enlarged constituency of Dublin Bay South. In April 2016, he was elected to the Seanad. He remained as a junior minister until 6 May 2016 during the talks on government formation. He was an unsuccessful candidate for Dublin Bay South at the 2020 general election.

References

1958 births
Living people
Labour Party (Ireland) TDs
Local councillors in Dublin (city)
Members of the 25th Seanad
Members of the 31st Dáil
Ministers of State of the 31st Dáil
Labour Party (Ireland) senators
Alumni of Dublin Institute of Technology